Igor Vladimirovich Kolyvanov (born 6 March 1968) is a Russian football manager and a former player. He is the manager of Tekstilshchik Ivanovo. During his playing career, he played as a striker, accumulating 90 goals scored in 333 games at the top level in the Soviet Union as well as in Italy.

He was the head coach of the Russia U17 national team that won the UEFA U-17 Championship in 2006. During his playing career he played for Dynamo Moscow, Foggia Calcio, and Bologna F.C. 1909, and was a regular member of the Russia national side.

Youth
Born in Moscow, Soviet Union, now Russia, Kolyvanov began playing organized football at the age of 9, when he was approached by Viktor Abayev. After training with Abaev for a year with children a year older than himself, Kolyvanov moved to the youth sport school of Soviet Region in Moscow, coached by Igor Shvykov. He attributes the core development of many of his skills to this stage. At the age of 14 he moved to another youth team, called FShM Moscow, and after a two-year stint with it, he was picked up by the famous Spartak Moscow youth system. Although Spartak was one of the leading teams in the Soviet Union at that time, Kolyvanov did not see a chance in breaking into the starting line-up, and when Dynamo Moscow called him in 1986, at the age of 17, he agreed to a move.

Playing career

Soviet Union & Russia
After transferring to Dynamo Moscow, Kolyvanov was injured in his very first game for the reserve team. However, after a recovery that took two months, he almost immediately began playing for the main team. In the same season, Dynamo almost won the Soviet Top League, being passed by Dynamo Kiev at the last second. While Dynamo Moscow would never achieve the level of that season, Kolyvanov improved his game significantly over the next few years, scoring 11 goals in the 1989 season of the Soviet Top League. It was then that he received his first call up for the Soviet national team, while still being a member of the Soviet U21 national team. In the Soviet Top League he established himself as a fine long shot striker that is able to score easily from outside the "penalty box". One of his biggest triumphs came for the latter of the two – in the 1990 UEFA European Under-21 Football Championship, he scored nine goals in seven matches, winning the best scorer award en route to winning the Championship. He followed up this performance by scoring 18 goals in 27 matches for Dynamo Moscow in 1991, once again winning the top-scorer award. The same year, his playing for the national team caught Foggia Calcio's attention, and after Dynamo reached the third-round of the UEFA Cup, he was allowed to transfer to Italy.

Foggia Calcio
After his transfer to Foggia Calcio, Kolyvanov was initially overwhelmed by the emphasis placed on conditioning, by then coach Zdeněk Zeman. The 4–3–3 system also took adjustment because Kolyvanov was used to playing as a center forward, while he had to assume a more pulled-back role now. During the time it took for these adjustments, coupled with slight injuries, Kolyvanov did not start for the team, but rather came on as a substitute. However starting with his second season he became a cornerstone of Foggia's attack, consistently placing in the middle of the Serie A until the 1994–95 season. That season he experienced another injury (right before a planned transfer to Inter Milan which consequently fell through), and Foggia slumped to the bottom of the Seria A and being relegated to Serie B. Although Kolyvanov was persuaded to stay by the management of the club another season, by the promise of promotion next season. In 1996 when Foggia failed to win promotion to Serie A he transferred to a team that did achieve promotion, Bologna F.C. 1909.

Bologna
At Bologna, Kolyvanov was able to play as a pure striker once again, without having responsibilities across the entire field like in Foggia. This immediately reflected on his goal scoring, and he was Bologna's top striker in his first season, with 11 goals in 27 games. The next few years he continued to score consistently, until the 1999–2000 season where a back problem resurfaced and he was forced to undergo an operation, essentially missing almost the entire season. An attempted comeback in mid-2000 was hampered by further injuries, and in 2001 Kolyvanov retired from professional football.

Coaching career
After a brief stint as the Russia U19 national team assistant coach in 2002, and enrollment in a football coaching institute, Kolyvanov took over the Russia U15 national team as the head coach. He took a number of tours throughout the country to select the players, who eventually became the Russia U17 national team that won the 2006 UEFA European Under-17 Football Championship. Kolyvanov's achievement as a coach was exemplified by the very organized and consistent tactical play of the team, especially for players of that age, along with extreme motivation. Although never listed amongst the tournament's favorites, and without star players, Russia was able to win because of these traits. After the victory, Kolyvanov was offered an extension to his contract, along with a salary raise. He remained the head coach of the same age group national team, when it effectively turned into the U19 team. On 20 November 2008, he was announced as the new head-coach of the Russia U21 team.

After returning FC Torpedo Moscow to the second-tier Russian Football National League at the end of the 2018–19 season, he was replaced by Sergei Ignashevich on 4 June 2019.

On 12 May 2022, Kolyvanov was hired by Tekstilshchik Ivanovo. The team was in last place in the FNL and could not at that point avoid relegation to the third-tier FNL2.

Career statistics

Honours

Player
 UEFA European Under-21 Championship: 1990
 Soviet Top League: runner-up 1986; third place 1991
 UEFA Intertoto Cup: 1998

Individual
 Soviet Footballer of the Year: 1991
 UEFA European Under-21 Championship top scorer: 1990 (nine goals in seven games)
 Soviet Top League top scorer: 1991 (18 goals in 27 games)
 Bologna top scorer: 1996–97 (11 goals in 27 matches)
 Member of Grigoriy Fedotov Club: 117 goals in professional competition
 Co-holder of Soviet Top League record for goals in one match – five

Managerial
 UEFA European Under-17 Championship: 2006
 Russian Professional Football League Zone best coach (2018–19).

References

External links
 Extensive Interview in Russian
 
 International Appearance Statistics
 Playing Career Statistics
 UEFA.com news article after victory in UEFA U-17 Championship
 UefaU17.com – A Russian Revolution?
 Player profile 

1968 births
Living people
Soviet footballers
Soviet Union under-21 international footballers
Soviet Union international footballers
Russian footballers
Footballers from Moscow
Russia international footballers
Dual internationalists (football)
FC Dynamo Moscow players
Russian Premier League players
Calcio Foggia 1920 players
Bologna F.C. 1909 players
Soviet Top League players
Serie A players
Serie B players
Expatriate footballers in Italy
Russian expatriate sportspeople in Italy
UEFA Euro 1992 players
UEFA Euro 1996 players
Russian football managers
FC Ufa managers
Russian Premier League managers
Russian expatriate footballers
Association football forwards
FC Torpedo Moscow managers
FC FShM Torpedo Moscow players
FC Ararat Yerevan managers
Russian expatriate football managers
Expatriate football managers in Armenia
Russian expatriate sportspeople in Armenia